Greylock Capital Management, LLC (Greylock Capital) is a U.S. Securities and Exchange Commission registered alternative investment adviser that invests in undervalued, distressed, and high yield assets worldwide, particularly in emerging and frontier markets. As is the case with comparable funds, the firm's investor base consists largely of institutional investors and a limited number of high net worth individuals. As a group, institutional investors may include banks, credit unions, insurance companies, pension funds, hedge funds, REITs, endowments and mutual funds.  As is common with many asset management firms, Greylock Capital is organized across a series of onshore and offshore limited partnerships.

History 
Greylock Capital was founded in 2004 by Hans Humes from a portfolio of emerging market assets managed by Humes while at Van Eck Global. AJ Mediratta is an additional equity partner and joined the firm in 2008 from Bear Stearns. The firm principally invests in high yield, emerging market fixed income instruments, but also has a long track record in sovereign debt restructuring.

In February 2021, Greylock Capital Management filed for Chapter 11 bankruptcy. The firm's management foresee the company continuing as a going concern.  With the global pandemic limiting a return to traditional office space, the firm may use bankruptcy protection to restructure or exit its midtown, NY office building in favor of smaller office locations and home-based operations.

Restructuring activity highlights 
Greylock Capital and its partners have participated in a number of corporate and sovereign debt restructurings in emerging markets. A selection of the firm's sovereign debt restructurings is below.

Argentina 
Greylock Capital Founder Hans Humes served as co-chair of the Global Committee of Argentina Bondholders following the Argentine Republic's debt default in 2002. The Argentine default is the largest sovereign default in history.

Barbados 
In October 2019, Barbados came agreed to terms with a creditor committee that allowed the country to restructure its approximately 7bn USD in sovereign debt. The creditor committee, co chaired by Eaton Vance Management and Greylock Capital, agreed to terms including an estimated 26% principal haircut and a new instrument maturing in 2029.  The new bond includes a "Hurricane Clause", which allows the island to suspend payments and capitalize interest in the event of a weather-related disaster.

Belize 
Following Belize's 2012 default on approximately US$500 million debt, a creditor committee of approximately 20 institutions formed. The creditor committee was co-leading by Greylock Capital and Zurich Insurance Group and several multilateral institutions were engaged as part of the restructuring process (i.e. the International Monetary Fund, the Inter-American Development Bank, the Caribbean Development Bank, US Department of Treasury, Institute of International Finance and Paris Club. A restructuring was concluded with the government in 2012 that achieved 86% investor participation. Such high participation rates are desired by countries undergoing debt restructuring because it significantly reduces the likelihood of future investor-initiated litigation.

Greece 
Greylock Capital served on the 12-member steering committee of investors engaged in the Greek sovereign debt restructuring. The firm was the sole American representative on the Greek bond steering committee, which controlled approximately 20% of all outstanding external Greek government debt. Greylock Capital was cited as one of the earlier fund investors in Greek debt, investing as early as 2011 when the bonds were trading as low as 12 cents on the dollar. Greylock Capital promoted the concept of debt warrants, whereby Greek government repayments were tied to economic growth.  The subsequent exchange offer was the largest sovereign debt restructuring in history.

Ivory Coast 
After having issued $2.8 billion in Brady Bonds in 1998, the Republic of the Ivory Coast defaulted on the debt in 2002 upon the outbreak of a civil war. Greylock Capital participated in the Republic's creditor committee and played a lead role in closing a deal between the republic and bondholders. Greylock Capital engaged multilateral institutions, including the World Bank, in order to effect a restructuring that was compatible with creditor rights and with the principles of debt relief under the HIPC Initiative.  The Ivory Coast restructuring was completed in 2010.

Lebanon 
The firm is currently part of a creditor group involved in discussions with the Lebanese Republic over Lebanon's 1.2 billion sovereign Eurobond. Other members of the Creditor Committee include Franklin Templeton Investments

As the national financial crisis worsened and the country's banks imposed liquidity restrictions, parliament speaker Nabih Berri stated that a debt restructuring was the best solution for the disposition of the Eurobond.

Liberia 
Greylock Capital served on the creditor committee of an investor group restructuring Liberia's pre-crisis debt, a transaction which enabled the country to regain international capital. As the largest commercial creditor to Liberia, Greylock Capital used its strong relationships with the existing government to lead a committee of investors to work with multilateral and non-financial partners to provide a framework for a successful restructuring of outstanding Liberian claims. The restructuring, completed in April 2009, featured several innovative elements, including Liberia's ability to do a significant, one-time only restructuring of all commercial claims. Unlike so-called vulture funds, Greylock Capital was highlighted for its negotiated method of sovereign debt restructuring.

Mozambique
A global creditor committee formed in 2016 following Mozambique's announcement of default on its outstanding external sovereign debt.  Committee discussions focused on the need to create near-term fiscal space for the country, which remains one of the world's poorest, while preserving upside for bond investors associated with Mozambique's vast offshore gas reserves. Consideration was also given to initiatives to improve transparency and resolve the scandal around undisclosed loans, both of which were viewed as critical in the country's efforts to normalize its relationship with the IMF and bilateral donors.  Greylock Capital led the negotiations that resulted in a preliminary agreement on restructuring terms that were finalized in late 2019. An exchange offer for the existing bonds closed in October 2019 with a final participation rate in excess of 98%.

Suriname
As of February 2021, the firm is part of a creditor committee in discussions with the Suriname concerning the restructuring of approximately $675 million in loans undertaken by the republic. Other members of the creditor committee include Franklin Templeton, Eaton Vance, GMO Investments. With negotiations continuing, creditors have accepted proposals by the Republic to defer some loan payments.

References

External links 
 Greylock Capital Home Page
 Greylock Capital registration at US Securities and Exchange Commission website

2004 establishments in New York City
American companies established in 2004
Financial services companies established in 2004
Investment companies based in New York City
Investment management companies of the United States
Privately held companies based in New York City
Companies that filed for Chapter 11 bankruptcy in 2021